Glen Allan is a census-designated place and unincorporated community located in far southern Washington County, Mississippi. It is situated immediately east of Lake Washington's southern shore.

it has a post office, with the ZIP code 38744.

It was first named as a CDP in the 2020 Census which listed a population of 298.

Demographics

2020 census

Note: the US Census treats Hispanic/Latino as an ethnic category. This table excludes Latinos from the racial categories and assigns them to a separate category. Hispanics/Latinos can be of any race.

Education
Glen Allan is served by the Western Line School District.  The elementary schools are O'Bannon Elementary and Riverside Elementary. The High Schools are O'Bannon High and Riverside High School.

Notable people
Glen Allan is the birthplace of author Clifton Taulbert and blues guitarist/singer songwriter Robert Lee "Smokey" Wilson.

References

External links

Unincorporated communities in Washington County, Mississippi
Unincorporated communities in Mississippi
Census-designated places in Washington County, Mississippi